Clappers is a small village in Scottish Borders, Scotland, located right next to the border with England. There is a small monument commemorating the Golden Jubilee of Queen Elizabeth II in the village.

Berwickshire
Villages in the Scottish Borders